Prince Hyohwa was a Korean Royal Prince as the second son of Gwangjong of Goryeo and Queen Daemok. Although his birth date was unclear, but based on his older brother, Gyeongjong of Goryeo who was born in 955, so Hyohwa should be born after that. Some modern historians hold the view that Hyohwa's early death saved his brother from death by their father. In 965, when Wang Ju appointed as the Crown Prince, many nobles and royals were killed due to Gwangjong's terror reign. Therefore, Ju also had to live with suspicion from their own father and fortunately, Hyohwa's too early death without any children to replaced Ju made Ju able to survived and succeeded the throne.

References

Year of birth unknown
Year of death unknown
10th-century Korean people
Korean princes